Go Vegan (formerly the Vegan Environmental Party) is a minor animal rights and environmentalist provincial political party in Ontario, Canada.

History
Go Vegan was founded as the Vegan Environmental Party in preparation for the 2011 Ontario general election.

The party did not present any candidates in the 2022 Ontario general election.

Ideology
The party stands for the protection of both animals and people, calling for:

 An end to animal agriculture in Ontario
 No new nuclear power plants in Ontario, and a decommissioning of those still in operation
 Focusing more on renewable energy sources
 Overhauling the Ministry of Natural Resources so that it represents the needs of all Ontarians (humans and nonhuman animals alike) rather than the needs of hunters.

Policy positions unrelated to the environment taken by the party would arguably place it on the left wing in Ontario politics. The party calls for increased welfare and disability funding to reflect the actual cost of living in Ontario, eliminating tuition fees at Ontario universities, raising the minimum wage in Ontario to reflect cost of living in Ontario, subsidizing affordable housing, increasing funding for public transportation, and eliminating public funding for religious schools. Like many minor political parties, Go Vegan calls for a change in the electoral system from a First past the post to a system involving Proportional representation.

Electoral results
In the 2011 Ontario general election, the Vegan Environmental Party nominated three candidates for the Legislative Assembly of Ontario:

In the 2014 election

In the 2018 election, the party ran two candidates:

See also 
 Animal Protection Party of Canada, a similar but unaffiliated party at the federal level

References

Animal advocacy parties
Provincial political parties in Ontario
2011 establishments in Ontario
Organizations based in Toronto
Political parties established in 2011
Vegan organizations